Saslong is a World Cup downhill ski course in Italy just above Val Gardena/Gröden. Located on the Langkofel in the Dolomites, the race course made its World Cup debut in February 1969.

Course sections

Spinel 
Difficult jump short after the start, into the steepest section (56.9% gradient), then virtual change direction in mid-air to compression.

Saut dl Moro 
A  jump which takes skiers into the second compression.

Looping

Muri di Sochers 
 jump in the air, followed by a flat, yet intense, left-right-left gate combination ending at the 1st Mauer ("Wall").

Skiers jump approximately  directly to the 1st Mauer and have to sway to the right to the 2nd Mauer.

Gobbe del Cammello (Camel Humps) 
The Camel Humps represent the most spectacular section of the Saslong. They were named by the late and former Austrian FIS TD Sepp Sulzberger.

Uli Spiess from Austria was the first athlete to attempt and succeed in jumping all three Humps at the same time instead of taking each jump separately.

Since Spiess' premiere, skiers today mostly absorb the first jump (a.k.a. "Girardelli Line") and leap from the second over the third.

The record jump belongs to Austrian skier Michael Walchhofer who leaped  reaching a height of 4–5 meters in 2003.

Ciaslat 
Ciaslat with its corrugated ripples and bumps is where the race is often decided. In this technically very demanding section of the course racers face overall 17 different ripples.

Nucia (Tunnel) 
Skiers take the Nucia jump into the final schuss following the exit from Ciaslat.

Schuss 
The jump owes its name to the new tunnel that runs below the Final schuss and is part of the new street by-passing St.Christina which was opened in 2009.

World Cup 

The first downhill winner in February 1969 was Jean-Daniel Dätwyler from Switzerland, and this annual ski event is part of the prestigious Saslong Classic competition.

Saslong hosted the World Championships in 1970, which also counted for 1970 World Cup season points and wins/podiums statistics.

On 23 March 1975, Saslong hosted the first parallel slalom in history, Gustav Thöni won in front of 40,000, beating Ingemar Stenmark in the final.

Men

Women

Club5+ 
In 1986, elite Club5 was originally founded by prestigious classic downhill organizers: Kitzbühel, Wengen, Garmisch, Val d’Isère and Val Gardena/Gröden, with goal to bring alpine ski sport on the highest levels possible.

Later over the years other classic longterm organizers joined the now named Club5+: Alta Badia, Cortina, Kranjska Gora, Maribor, Lake Louise, Schladming, Adelboden, Kvitfjell, St.Moritz and Åre.

References

External links

FIS Alpine Ski World Cup – Val Gardena, Italy 
Ski-db.com - Val Gardena men's races

Skiing in Italy